Emily Frances Bitze is the Canadian founder of Bunz Trading Zone and the vocalist and guitarist in the Toronto band Milk Lines, and the bassist for Toronto band Wish.

Early life and education 
Bitze was born and grew up in Montreal, where she obtained her degree in fashion design. Her full name is Emily Frances Bitze.

Career 
After graduation, Bitze moved to Toronto to work in a vintage fashion shop While in Toronto, she founded a Facebook group that later became the Bunz Trading Zone 

Bitze is a vocalist, guitarist, and co-lead of the Toronto-based, four-piece band Milk Lines. Bitze is also a bassist for the Toronto band Wish.

Personal life 
In the late 2010's, Bitze moved to Vancouver.

References 

Living people
Musicians from Montreal
Musicians from Toronto
Women founders
Organization founders
Social media influencers
Musicians from Vancouver
Year of birth missing (living people)